John L. Martin (born June 5, 1941, in Eagle Lake, Maine) is an American politician of the Democratic Party. Martin has been in Maine politics since his first election to the Maine House of Representatives in 1964, and is sometimes called "The Earl of Eagle Lake" as a result.  With his election in 2014, he is the longest serving legislator in Maine history.

Political career
Martin was a member of the Maine House of Representatives from 1964 through 1994, serving as Minority Floor Leader from 1971 through 1974. Following that he was elected Speaker of the House from 1975 through 1994.  In 1992, one of his aides was convicted in a ballot tampering scandal involving two close House races. It is believed that, combined with his length of service, contributed to Maine voters approving legislative term limits in 1993.  In criticizing term limits in 2014, Governor Paul LePage cited Martin as an example of how experienced legislators would benefit the State as opposed to inexperienced legislators with "firm agendas".

From 2000 through 2008, Martin represented the 35th district in the Maine Senate. During that time he also served as Assistant Majority Leader.

In 2008, Martin was again elected to the House.  He was defeated for re-election in 2012 by Republican Michael Nadeau.  Martin stated it was due to money and negative campaigning, stating that "If you throw enough mud around, some of it’s going to stick."  Financial problems, including failing to pay back loans from two government agencies for his Tamarack Inn, as well as a bankruptcy, may also have played a role in his defeat. He did not rule out running in the future, and said he would remain involved in politics.

Martin filed to enter the 2014 race for his old seat, which was re-numbered District 151.  State records erroneously listed him as a Republican despite his still being a Democrat. Maine Secretary of State Matthew Dunlap stated the error would be corrected.  Martin defeated Nadeau in the November 4, 2014 election.

Family
Martin is single.

Education
In 1963, Martin received his BA in History/Government from the University of Maine Orono.

Political experience
From 1964 to 1994, 2008–2012, and again from 2014 to present, Martin has been a  representative for the Maine State House of Representatives
In 2008 was an assistant majority leader for the Maine State Senate
From 2000 to 2008 was a senator for Maine State Senate
From 1975 to 1994 was a Speaker of the House for the Maine State House
From 1971 to 1974 was a House minority floor leader for the Maine State House
Member of the Democratic National Committee

Professional experience
Is an assistant professor in political science and government at the University of Maine Fort Kent.
Takes part in graduate work in political science at the University of Maine Orono.

References

External links
Maine Senate Democrats - Senator John L. Martin official government website
Project Vote Smart - Representative-elect John L. Martin (ME) profile
Follow the Money – John L. Martin
2006 2004 2002 2000 State Senate campaign contributions
2008 1998 1996 State House campaign contributions

1941 births
Living people
People from Aroostook County, Maine
Democratic Party Maine state senators
Speakers of the Maine House of Representatives
Democratic Party members of the Maine House of Representatives
Minority leaders of the Maine House of Representatives
University of Maine alumni
21st-century American politicians